Accounting Principles Board Opinions, Interpretations and Recommendations were published by the Accounting Principles Board from 1962 to 1973. The board was created by American Institute of Certified Public Accountants (AICPA) in 1959 and was replaced by Financial Accounting Standards Board (FASB) in 1973. Its mission was to develop an overall conceptual framework of US generally accepted accounting principles (US GAAP). APB was the main organization setting the US GAAP and its opinions are still an important part of it. All of the Opinions have been superseded in 2009 by FASB's Accounting Standards Codification.

Accounting Interpretations

The American Institute of Certified Public Accountants issued Accounting Interpretations between 1968 and November 1973, when the Financial Accounting Standards Board took over the issuing of interpretations in June 1974. The Interpretations were not considered pronouncements from the Accounting Principles Board, but Richard C. Lytle, the administrative director of the Accounting Principles Board, was responsible for their preparation. The Interpretations originally appeared in the Journal of Accountancy. For Interpretations see section 9551 of the final edition of the APB Accounting Principles, Volume 2, Original Pronouncements as of June 30, 1973. The interpretation numbers come from the Financial Accounting Board's  Original Pronouncements as amended 2008/2009 Edition, volume 3.  Also, consult this volume for detailed listing of amendments, deletions, and other changes to the individual interpretations prior to 2009 (when the Accounting Standards Codification was issued.) Also, consult Fasb Pre-Codification AICPA Copyrighted Standards for those Interpretations (AIN-APB 9, 18, 20, 21, 26,and 30) that were finally superseded by the Codification.

See also
American Institute of Certified Public Accountants
Financial Accounting Standards Board
US GAAP
AICPA Statements of Position

United States Generally Accepted Accounting Principles